Maritzburg United is a South African football club based in the city of Pietermaritzburg that currently plays in the Premier Soccer League.

Honours
First Division Coastal Stream champions: 2007–08
First Division Championship Play-offs: 2008
Maritzburg United Vs SuperSport United: 2022

Club records
Most starts:  Shu-Aib Walters &  Peter Petersen 107
Most goals:  Fadlu Davids 20
Most starts in a season:  Shu-Aib Walters &  Mario Booysen 35 (2012/13)
Most goals in a season:  Cuthbert Malajila 13 (2012/13)
Record victory: 4–0 vs Bloemfontein Celtic (12/01/18, PSL)
Record defeat: 0–7 vs SuperSport United (14/10/11, PSL)
Source:

Premier Soccer League record
2005–06 – 14th
2006–07 – 16th (relegated)
2008–09 – 12th
2009–10 – 11th
2010–11 – 12th
2011–12 – 11th
2012–13 – 11th
2013–14 – 10th
2014–15 – 8th
2015–16 – 14th
2016–17 – 7th
2017–18 – 4th
2018–19 – 15th
2019–20 – 7th
2020–21 – 13th

Club officials/Technical team
BOARD OF DIRECTORS
Chairman:  Farook Kadodia
Executive Director:Imraan Kadodia
Executive Director:Abu Khatib
Executive Director:Bashir Moosa
Chief Executive Officer:Younus Kadodia
MANAGEMENT TEAM AND STAFF
Club Attorney:Asif Essa
Operations Manager:  Quintin Jettoo
Club Accountant:Muhammed Goga
Office Administrator:Hlubi Msimang
Match Day Coordinator:Rajin Bharath
Media Officer:Zolani Msobo
Ticket Officer:Radesh Behari
Logistics Officers:Zama Zungu/ Manyoni Mhlongo/ Bule Bujela
Receptionist: Ziyanda Nkabinde
TECHNICAL TEAM
Coach:  Fadluu Davids
Assistant coach: Maahier Davids
Goalkeeper coach: Rowen Fernandez
Head of Analysis: Pedro Ramos
Head of youth development:  Peter Petersen (soccer)

First-team squad

Shirt sponsor and kit manufacturer
Shirt sponsor: Gift of the Givers
Kit manufacturer: Lotto

Notable former coaches
 Trott Moloto (2004)
 Boebie Solomons (1 July 2004 – 30 June 2005)
 Kosta Papić (1 July 2006 – 20 Dec 2006)
 Steve Komphela (1 Jan 2007 – 9 Jan 2007)
 Vladislav Herić (10 Jan 2007 – 6 March 2007)
 Mlungisi Ngubane (8 March 2007 – 30 June 2007)
 Ian Palmer (1 July 2007 – 10 July 2008)
 Gordon Igesund (15 July 2008 – 15 Nov 2009)
 Ernst Middendorp (16 Nov 2009 – 12 March 2011)
 Ian Palmer (14 March 2011 – 13 Jan 2012)
 Ernst Middendorp (19 Jan 2012 – 10 Oct 2013)
 Clinton Larsen (15 Oct 2013 – 6 Jan 2014)
 Steve Komphela (6 Jan 2014 – 17 June 2015)
 Clive Barker (25 Sep 2015 – 1 Dec 2015)
 Ernst Middendorp (28 Dec 2015 – 28 Nov 2016)
 Roger De Sa (10 Jan 2017 – 23 Mar 2017)

References
Phumlani Ntshangase appointed as new Maritzburg United captain

External links
 
Premier Soccer League
PSL Club Info
South African Football Association
Confederation of African Football

 
Association football clubs established in 1979
Pietermaritzburg
Premier Soccer League clubs
Soccer clubs in KwaZulu-Natal
1979 establishments in South Africa